Eucarphia is a genus of snout moths. It was described by Jacob Hübner in 1825.

Species
 Eucarphia anomala Balinsky, 1994
 Eucarphia hemityrella (de Joannis, 1927)
 Eucarphia leucomera (Hampson, 1926)
 (Eucarphia resectella (Werneburg, 1865))
 Eucarphia vinetella (Fabricius, 1787)

References

Phycitini
Pyralidae genera